Micheluzzi is an Italian surname. Notable people with the surname include:

 Attilio Micheluzzi (1930–1990), Italian comics artist
 Carlo Micheluzzi (1886–1973), Italian actor

Italian-language surnames
Patronymic surnames
Surnames from given names